Deborah Crombie (née Darden) is an American author of the Duncan Kincaid / Gemma James mystery series set in the United Kingdom. Crombie was raised in Richardson, Texas, and has lived in the United Kingdom. She now lives in  McKinney, Texas.

Crombie studied biology at Austin College and was a writing student of Warren Norwood at Tarrant County College.

Bibliography

Duncan Kincaid & Gemma James series

A Share in Death (1993)
All Shall be Well (1994)
Leave the Grave Green (1995)
Mourn Not Your Dead (1996)
Dreaming of the Bones (1997)
Kissed a Sad Goodbye (1999)
A Finer End (2001)
And Justice There is None (2002)
Now May You Weep (2003)
In a Dark House (2005)
Water Like a Stone (2007)
Where Memories Lie (2008)
Necessary as Blood (2009)
"Nocturne" (2012; short story, limited-edition e-book)
No Mark upon Her (2012)
The Sound of Broken Glass (2013)
To Dwell in Darkness (2014)
Garden of Lamentations (2017) 
A Bitter Feast (2019)
A Killing of Innocents (2023)

References

External links
 

Living people
20th-century American novelists
21st-century American novelists
American expatriates in England
American mystery writers
American women novelists
Austin College alumni
Macavity Award winners
People from McKinney, Texas
Novelists from Texas
Women mystery writers
20th-century American women writers
21st-century American women writers
People from Richardson, Texas
Year of birth missing (living people)